Mount Spencer is a peak 1 nautical mile (1.9 km) south of Mount Darling in the Allegheny Mountains of the Ford Ranges, Marie Byrd Land. Discovered on aerial flights from West Base of the United States Antarctic Service (USAS) (1939–41) and named for Herbert R. Spencer of Erie, PA, the Sea Scout commander of Paul Siple, leader of the West Base party of that expedition.

References

Ford Ranges